The following is a list of county roads in Highlands County, Florida.  All county roads are maintained by the county in which they reside.

County roads in Highlands County

References

FDOT Map of Highlands County, Florida
FDOT GIS data, accessed January 2014

 
County